Ferric acetate is the acetate salt of the coordination complex [Fe3O(OAc)6(H2O)3]+ (OAc− is CH3CO2−). Commonly the salt is known as "basic iron acetate".  The formation of the red-brown complex was once used as a test for ferric ions.

Structure and synthesis 
Basic iron acetate forms on treating aqueous solutions of iron(III) sources with acetate salts. A typical precursor is freshly precipitated iron oxide/hydroxide, which is halide-free.

Early work showed that the cation is trinuclear. The Fe centres are equivalent, each being octahedral, being bound to six oxygen ligands, including a triply bridging oxide at the center of the equilateral triangle.  The compound was an early example of a molecular complex of iron that features an oxide ligand.  The cation has idealized D3h symmetry.

Reactions 
The terminal aqua ligands on the trimetallic framework can be substituted with other ligands, such as pyridine and dimethylformamide. Many different salts are known by exchanging the anion, e.g. [Fe3(μ3-O)(OAc)6(H2O)3]Cl. Reduction of the cation affords the neutral mixed-valence derivative that contains one ferrous and two ferric centers. Mixed metal species are known such as [Fe2CoO(OAc)6(H2O)3].

Related compounds 
Chromium(III), ruthenium(III), vanadium(III), and rhodium(III) form analogous compounds. Iron(III) acetate (lacking the oxo ligand) has been claimed as a red coloured compound from the reaction of silver acetate and iron(III) chloride.

Uses 
Materials prepared by heating iron, acetic acid, and air, loosely described as basic iron acetates, are used as dyes and mordants.

Iron acetate is often brushed upon untreated wood to give it an aged appearance.

See also
Iron(II) acetate
Cobalt(II) acetate
Rhodium(II) acetate
Manganese(III) acetate
Chromium(III) acetate

References 

Acetates
Iron(III) compounds
Iron complexes